The 2020–21 Cymru Premier (known as the JD Cymru Premier for sponsorship reasons) was the 29th season of the Cymru Premier (formally known as the Welsh Premier League), the highest football league within Wales since its establishment in 1992. Connah's Quay Nomads were the defending champions. Teams played each other twice on a home and away basis, before the league split into two groups after phase 1 matches were completed.

COVID-19 restrictions were put in place by the FAW. Starting Monday 10 August 2020, clubs could train in groups of 15 and contact training was allowed at all-levels of football. However, competitive and exhibition matches were not allowed to take place at this time.

On 21 August 2020, The Football Association of Wales received confirmation that the JD Cymru Premier has been granted elite athletic status by the Welsh Government, meaning that the 2020–21 season could commence on 11 September 2020.

Teams
Twelve teams competed in the league – the top ten teams from the previous season, and one team each promoted from the second tier, the Cymru North and Cymru South.

The two bottom placed teams from the 2019–20 season, Airbus UK Broughton and Carmarthen Town, were relegated to the Cymru North and the Cymru South respectively for the 2020–21 season.

Flint Town United, runners-up of the Cymru North were promoted to the league due to champions Prestatyn Town's failure to secure a Tier 1 license. Similarly, Haverfordwest County, runners-up of the Cymru South, were also promoted due to champions Swansea University's failure to secure a Tier 1 license.

Stadia and locations

Personnel and kits

League table

Results
12 September 2020 - 31 May 2021

Matches 1–22

 On 17 August 2020 the FAW announced that all official domestic match balls will be sponsored by Macron
 Welsh television channel S4C will broadcast certain matches

Matches 23–32

Top six

Bottom six

UEFA Europa Conference League play-offs

Teams that finished in positions fourth to seventh at the end of the regular season participated in play-offs to determine the third participant to enter the Europa Conference League first qualifying round.

Semi-finals

Final

Season statistics

Top scorers

Monthly awards

Annual awards

References

Cymru Premier seasons
2020–21 in Welsh football
Wales